Tony Heath (born 10 October 1937) is a former Australian rules footballer who played with Collingwood in the Victorian Football League (VFL).

Notes

External links 		

		
		

1937 births
Australian rules footballers from Victoria (Australia)		
Collingwood Football Club players
Living people